"No Good in Goodbye" is a song by Irish rock band The Script. It was released on 15 October 2014 as the second single from their fourth studio album No Sound Without Silence (2014).

According to The Script vocalist Danny O'Donoghue, the band's material is made up of complex thoughts condensed down to really simple songs. He explained that with this track, "we wanted to put a twist on a word: where's the good in goodbye, where's the fair in farewell... Then we tried to make that into a lyrical idea, which seemed to work really well."

Charts

Weekly charts

Year-end charts

References

The Script songs
Rock ballads
2014 songs
2014 singles
Columbia Records singles
Songs written by Danny O'Donoghue
Songs written by Mark Sheehan